Birsky Uyezd (Бирский уезд) was one of the subdivisions of the Ufa Governorate of the Russian Empire. It was situated in the northern part of the governorate. Its administrative centre was Birsk.

Demographics
At the time of the Russian Empire Census of 1897, Birsky Uyezd had a population of 497,696. Of these, 52.7% spoke Bashkir, 28.4% Russian, 13.3% Mari, 4.3% Udmurt, 1.0% Tatar and 0.2% Turkmen as their native language.

References

 
Uezds of Ufa Governorate
Ufa Governorate